Vivian Knarvik Bugge (born 17 January 1960) is a Norwegian politician for the Christian Democratic Party.

She served as a deputy representative to the Parliament of Norway from Telemark during the term 1997–2001. In total, she met during 14 days of parliamentary session.

References

1960 births
Living people
Deputy members of the Storting
Christian Democratic Party (Norway) politicians
Politicians from Telemark
Women members of the Storting
20th-century Norwegian women politicians
Place of birth missing (living people)